When referring to political divisions of China, town is the standard English translation of the Chinese . The Constitution of the People's Republic of China classifies towns as third-level administrative units, along with for example townships. A township is typically smaller in population and more remote than a town.

Similarly to a higher-level administrative units, the borders of a town would typically include an urban core (a small town with the population on the order of 10,000 people), as well as rural area with some villages (or ).

Map representation 
A typical provincial map would merely show a town as a circle centered at its urban area and labeled with its name, while a more detailed one (e.g., a map of a single county-level division) would also show the borders dividing the county or county-level city into towns and/or township and subdistrict (街道) units.

The town in which the county level government, and usually the division's main urban area), are located is often not marked on less-detailed maps, because its location is usually labeled with the name of the county level division rather than the name of the actual town into which this urban area falls. For example, the county government of Tongshan County is located in Tongyang Town, but the maps would normally show it with a circle labeled "Tongshan County" or simply "Tongshan". Road signs would also normally show distance to "Tongshan" rather than "Tongyang".

On the other hand, more detailed maps - e.g., maps of individual prefecture-level cities in a provincial atlas - would label the county seat location with both the name of the county (e.g.) and, below, and in a smaller font, with the name of the township (e.g.).

Intercity buses, trains, or riverboats destined to, or stopping at a county seat may designate its destination either by the name of the county or the name of the county-seat township.

Usage of zhen in Taiwan 

In contrast to the PRC, in the official translation adopted in the ROC, both the characters "" and "" are translated as "townships", with  specifically being "urban" township, 'with  specifically translated as "rural" township

Gallery

References 

 01
Township-level divisions of China
Populated places in China